Nicole Katherine Ohlde (born March 13, 1982) is a former American professional basketball player. She most recently played for the Phoenix Mercury and the Tulsa Shock of the Women's National Basketball Association.

College years
Born in Clay Center, Kansas, Ohlde played collegiately at Kansas State University, where she was a two-time, first-team All-American (2003, 2004). She left Kansas State as the school's all-time leader in points, rebounds, and blocked shots.

Ohlde majored in social science while at Kansas State.

Kansas State statistics

Source

WNBA career
In the 2004 WNBA Draft, Ohlde was selected by the Minnesota Lynx in the first round (sixth overall). As a rookie, Ohlde averaged 11.7 points, 5.7 rebounds and 1.8 assists per game.  She averaged 11.2 points, 5.7 rebounds and 2.3 assists per game in 2005. In 2006, her production dipped to 9.6 points, 5.6 rebounds and 1.6 assists per game. She spent most of the season playing center, rather than her natural power forward position.

On January 30, 2009, Ohlde was traded to the Phoenix Mercury for Kelly Miller and LaToya Pringle. She won the 2009 WNBA title as a member of the Mercury.

On July 23, 2010, Ohlde was traded from Phoenix to the Tulsa Shock along with a 2011 first-round draft pick in exchange for Kara Braxton.

She announced her retirement from the league prior to the 2011 season.

WNBA career statistics

Regular season

|-
| align="left" | 2004
| align="left" | Minnesota
| 34 || 34 || 29.9 || .442 || .000 || .706 || 5.7 || 1.8 || 0.5 || 1.3 || 2.2 || 11.7
|-
| align="left" | 2005
| align="left" | Minnesota
| 34 || 34 || 30.5 || .355 || .000 || .817 || 5.7 || 2.3 || 0.6 || 0.6 || 2.5 || 11.2
|-
| align="left" | 2006
| align="left" | Minnesota
| 34 || 34 || 25.6 || .453 || .000 || .664 || 5.6 || 1.6 || 0.6 || 0.7 || 2.2 || 9.6
|-
| align="left" | 2007
| align="left" | Minnesota
| 34 || 34 || 27.1 || .374 || .000 || .845 || 6.1 || 1.6 || 0.5 || 0.6 || 2.4 || 11.5
|-
| align="left" | 2008
| align="left" | Minnesota
| 34 || 34 || 16.4 || .453 || .000 || .785 || 3.3 || 1.3 || 0.3 || 0.6 || 1.5 || 5.8
|-
|style="text-align:left;background:#afe6ba;"|  2009†
| align="left" | Phoenix
| 21 || 0 || 14.8 || .535 || .000 || .717 || 2.8 || 0.3 || 0.2 || 1.0 || 1.4 || 5.2
|-
| align="left" | 2010
| align="left" | Phoenix
| 20 || 0 || 11.1 || .442 || .000 || .609 || 1.9 || 0.5 || 0.2 || 0.4 || 0.8 || 3.0
|-
| align="left" | 2010
| align="left" | Tulsa
| 12 || 9 || 25.1 || .443 || .000 || .773 || 3.8 || 1.4 || 0.7 || 0.8 || 2.2 || 7.9
|-
| align="left" | Career
| align="left" | 7 years, 3 team
| 223 || 179 || 23.5 || .437 || .000 || .755 || 4.7 || 1.5 || 0.4 || 0.8 || 1.9 || 8.8

Playoffs

|-
| align="left" | 2004
| align="left" | Minnesota
| 2 || 2 || 37.0 || .478 || .000 || .600 || 5.0 || 4.5 || 0.5 || 0.0 || 3.0 || 14.0
|-
|style="text-align:left;background:#afe6ba;"|  2009†
| align="left" | Phoenix
| 11 || 0 || 13.6 || .636 || .000 || .200 || 2.7 || 0.4 || 0.4 || 0.3 || 0.9 || 2.6
|-
| align="left" | Career
| align="left" | 2 years, 2 team
| 13 || 2 || 17.2 || .556 || .000 || .467 || 3.1 || 1.0 ||0.4 || 0.2 || 1.2 || 4.4

Accomplishments 

Kodak All-American (2004, 2003)
AP First Team All-American (2004,2003)
USBWA All-American (2004, 2003)
Big 12 Conference Player of the Year (2003, 2004)
All-Big 12 First Team (2004, 2005, 2006)
All-Big 12 Third Team (2001)
Big 12 Freshman of the Year (2001)
Academic All-Big 12 first team (2004, 2003, 2002)
Kansas State's all-time leading scorer (2161), rebounder (970), and shot blocker (201)
Two-time gold medalist as a member of the USA Basketball World Championships for Young Women team (2003, 2002)
Named to the 2006 USA Basketball Senior National Team for the USA's March 17–24 European Tour
Member of the 2009 WNBA Championship team (Phoenix Mercury)

References

External links
WNBA Player Profile
WNBA 2004 Draft Prospectus
USA Basketball bio
Lynx trade Ohlde to the Mercury for Miller and Pringle

1982 births
Living people
All-American college women's basketball players
American women's basketball players
Basketball players from Kansas
Centers (basketball)
Kansas State Wildcats women's basketball players
Minnesota Lynx draft picks
Minnesota Lynx players
People from Clay Center, Kansas
Phoenix Mercury players
Power forwards (basketball)
Tulsa Shock players